Dirce Reis is a municipality in the state of São Paulo in Brazil, situated at an elevation of 402 m. The population is 1,799 (2020 est.) in an area of 88.3 km2.

References

Municipalities in São Paulo (state)